Peroxisomal proliferator-activated receptor A interacting complex 285, also known as PRIC285, is a human gene.

The protein encoded by this gene is a nuclear transcriptional co-activator for peroxisome proliferator activated receptor alpha. The encoded protein contains a zinc finger and is a helicase that appears to be part of the peroxisome proliferator activated receptor alpha interacting complex. This gene is a member of the DNA2/NAM7 helicase gene family. Alternatively spliced transcript variants encoding different isoforms have been found for this gene.

References

Further reading